The 1991 Iowa Hawkeyes football team represented the University of Iowa in the 1991 NCAA Division I-A football season as a member of the Big Ten Conference. The team was coached by Hayden Fry and played their home games at Kinnick Stadium.

Schedule

Roster

Rankings

Game summaries

Hawaii

Sources: Box Score and Game Story

at Iowa State

Sources: Box Score and Game Story

Northern Illinois

Michigan

    
    
    
    
    
    
    
    
    
    
    

In the 1991 Big Ten opener, the Hawkeyes led 18–7 midway through the second quarter, but could not stop the Michigan ground game as the Wolverines rolled up 371 yards rushing on 50 attempts. This game essentially decided the conference championship as both teams won the remainder of their Big Ten games.

Prior to kickoff, 1957 Outland Trophy winner Alex Karras was presented with a plaque from the College Football Hall of Fame.

at Wisconsin

Sources: Box Score and Game Story

Illinois

Sources: Box Score and Game Story

at Purdue

Source: Box Score and Game Story

at Ohio State

Source: Box Score and Game Story

The Hawkeyes played without decals on their helmets in honor of the fallen from an on-campus shooting the day before. Leroy Smith recorded a school-record 5 sacks in the road victory over the Buckeyes.

Indiana

Sources: Box Score 
    
    
    
    
    
    
    
    
    
    

Mike Saunders became the fifth Iowa player to score four touchdowns in a game, tying the school record. The Iowa defense forced four interceptions from Indiana quarterback Trent Green.

at Northwestern

Sources: Box Score and Game Story

Minnesota

Sources: Box Score and Game Story
    
    
    
    
    

The Hawkeyes closed the regular season with a win in the snow, giving Coach Fry his 100th victory at Iowa.

vs. BYU (Holiday Bowl)

Postseason awards
Hayden Fry – co-Big Ten Coach of the Year
Leroy Smith, Defensive end – Consensus First-team All-American, Big Ten Defensive Player of the Year and Big Ten Defensive Lineman of the Year
Mike Devlin, Center – First-team All-American

Team players in the 1992 NFL Draft

References

Iowa
Iowa Hawkeyes football seasons
Holiday Bowl champion seasons
Iowa Hawkeyes football